Wengert is a German surname that may refer to:

 Andreas Wengert (born 1944), Olympic sailor from Brazil
 Don Wengert (born 1969), American former professional baseball pitcher
 Nina Wengert (born 1984), German rower
 Norman Wengert (1916–2001), American political scientist
 Paul Wengert (born 1952), Mayor of Augsburg in Bavaria

See also 
 Wenger
 Wingert